Alexander Hill may refer to:
 Alexander Hill (minister) (1785–1867), Scottish minister of the Church of Scotland
 Alexander Staveley Hill (1825–1905), British lawyer and politician
 Alexander Hill (academic) (1856–1929), British physician and academic
 Alexander Erskine-Hill (1894–1947), Scottish Unionist Party politician
 Alexander Hill (rower) (born 1993), Australian rower
 Alexander Hill (Ross Island), a hill on Ross Island, Antarctica

See also
 Al Hill (disambiguation)
 Alex Hill (disambiguation)
 Alexander Hills, mountain range, California
 Alexandra Hill (disambiguation)
 Hill (surname)
 

Hill, Alexander